Pangasinan State University—Urdaneta is a satellite campus of Pangasinan State University located in Urdaneta, Pangasinan, Philippines.

Pangasinan State University Urdaneta originated as a geographic satellite of PSU Asingan. The project to create a satellite campus in Urdaneta was inspired from the ideas of Rodolfo V. Asanion, who was then Dean of the Asingan Campus and later became the University President. It became a separate College of Engineering on August 1, 1989.

Programs
Bachelor of Science in Civil Engineering
Bachelor of Science in Electrical Engineering
Bachelor of Science in Computer Engineering
Bachelor of Science in Mechanical Engineering
Bachelor of Science in Mathematics, major in Statistics
Bachelor of Science in Architecture
Bachelor of Science in Information and Communications Technology
Bachelor of Arts in English
Bachelor of Secondary Education, major in Filipino
Bachelor of Secondary Education, major in General Science
Bachelor of Early Childhood Education

Former programs
Bachelor of Computer Science
Bachelor of Science in mathematics, major in pure math
Associate in Information Technology

Proposed programs
Bachelor of Science in geodetic engineering
Bachelor of Science in manufacture engineering
Bachelor of Science in electronics and communications engineering
Bachelor of Science in chemical engineering

Student publication
The Technoscope Publications is the official student publication, funded and published by its students.

PSU Graduate School
Although incorporated in same location, PSU Graduate School is autonomous and is administered by different professionals with the PSU Urdaneta (Undergraduate). It offers:

Doctor of Philosophy in development studies
Doctor of Education, with majors: educational management, mathematics, guidance counseling
Master of Arts in education, with majors: educational management, guidance and counseling, communication arts-Filipino, communication arts-English, special education, science education, mathematics, technology and home economics, instructional leadership, computer education, social science
Master in Development Management, with major in public management
Master in Management Engineering
Master of Science in agriculture, with majors in crop science and animal science
Master of Science in Aquaculture

References

Universities and colleges in Pangasinan
Education in Urdaneta, Pangasinan